Events from the year 1637 in France

Incumbents
 Monarch – Louis XIII

Events

Births

16 April – Johan Vibe, military officer and engineer, Governor-general of Norway (d. 1710)

Full date missing
Nicolas Catinat, Marshal of France (died 1712)
Jacques Marquette, Jesuit missionary (died 1675)

Deaths

Full date missing
Philippe Habert, poet (born 1604)
Augustin de Beaulieu, general (born 1589)
Guillaume Courtet, Dominican priest, martyr (born 1589)
Charles d'Ambleville, composer
Henri de Bailly, composer

New books published
René Descartes (1596-1650), ''Discourse on the Method''.

See also

References

1630s in France